Kampung Kasipillay is a small village in Kuala Lumpur, Malaysia. It is located between Segambut and Sentul.

References

Suburbs in Kuala Lumpur